Werner Schröter (born 28 June 1944) is a German former wrestler. He competed in the men's Greco-Roman 74 kg at the 1972 Summer Olympics.

References

External links
 

1944 births
Living people
German male sport wrestlers
Olympic wrestlers of West Germany
Wrestlers at the 1972 Summer Olympics
People from East Prussia
People from Kaliningrad Oblast